Devil in My Ride is a 2013 American horror comedy road movie and the feature film directorial debut of Gary Michael Schultz, who also co-wrote the movie's script. It had its world premiere on October 6, 2013 at Shriekfest and was released to video on demand the following year. It stars Joey Bicicchi and Erin Breen as a couple whose dream wedding is ruined when the bride gets possessed by the Devil. Filming took place in Chicago and Las Vegas.

Synopsis
Hank (Joey Bicicchi) and Doreen (Erin Breen) are madly in love and can't wait to get married. They've planned out their special day in painstaking detail, from what to wear to who to invite. Everything seems to be going well until Doreen's brother Travis (Frank Zieger) shows up with a present for his sister, a beautiful but cursed locket that causes Doreen to get possessed by the Devil. Now Travis and Hank have to drive to Las Vegas in order to find Johnny Priest (Llou Johnson) a homeless exorcist and the last known person to have successfully performed an exorcism- something made more difficult because they only have 72 hours to find Johnny and perform the exorcism before Doreen's soul is forever lost.

Cast
Frank Zieger as Travis
Joey Bicicchi as Hank
Erin Breen as Doreen
Sid Haig as Iggy
Llou Johnson as Johnny Priest
Zarinah Ali as Veronica the Sales Clerk
Hud Cantu as Groomsman Hud
Tom Carlson as Gustor
Harold Dennis as Mechanic
Craig J. Harris as Pawn Shop Owner
Chris Heinrich as Groomsman Rick
Cathleen Hennon as Church Woman
Dave Lipschutz as Beaver
Rachel Joy Mazza as Gypsy
Benjamin Nicholson as Gator

Receptions
Fangoria gave Devil in My Ride a positive review, praising the film for its acting and "squirm-worthy horror moments". Twitch Film and Dread Central were more mixed in their reviews, as they both felt that the movie's tone was inconsistent at times and Twitch Film wrote that it "doesn't strike as an incredibly creative piece of guerrilla filmmaking, but it is for sure an entertaining trip to enjoy with a bunch of friends."

References

External links
 
 

2013 films
2013 horror films
American comedy horror films
American road movies
American supernatural horror films
Demons in film
The Devil in film
Films about curses
Films about exorcism
Films shot in Chicago
Films shot in Los Angeles
Films about spirit possession
2010s English-language films
2010s American films